The Christian National Trade Union Federation (CNV) is a federation of trade unions of the Netherlands.

History
The CNV was founded on 13 May 1909, in Arnhem as a federation of several Christian unions. It was founded in reaction to the socialist Dutch Confederation of Trade Unions (NVV), which was founded in 1906. The CNV was more moderate than the NVV.  It opposed the idea of class struggle and instead oriented itself towards a corporatist model of the economy. It was an interconfessional union, intended to represent both Protestant and Roman Catholic workers.

In 1912, however, the Roman Catholic bishops spoke out against interconfessional unions. All Roman Catholics left CNV and  founded a separate Roman Catholic union, the RKWV "Rooms-Katholieke Werklieden Verbond" (Roman Catholic Workers' Union). The CNV orientated itself towards the Protestant Anti-Revolutionary Party, with which it formed the Protestant pillar.

After World War II, the corporatist model, which the CNV advocated was introduced in the Netherlands, this was combined with a strong welfare state. Unions received more influence in Dutch politics: the CNV became part of the Social-Economic Council an advisory board of government composed of representatives from unions, employers' organisations and independent scientists.

Because of the depillarisation of Dutch society and the rising political polarisation between left and right, the three major unions, the socialist NVV, the Protestant CNV and the Dutch Catholic Trade Union Federation (NKV) began to open talks in order to found one single federation of Dutch unions. In 1974 the CNV left those talks.  In 1976 the NVV and NKV merged to form the Federation of Dutch Trade Unions (FNV), which was led by Wim Kok.

Activities
The most important function of CNV is the CAO-talks, over wages and secondary working conditions, it holds with the employers' federations. It also advises government via the Social Economic Council in which other unions, the employers' organisations and government appointed experts also have seats.

Ideology
The CNV started out as a moderate, Christian-democratic union, which was opposed to class struggle and workers' ownership of the means of production.  Gradually, however, it oriented itself towards cooperation with the employers' organisations and a corporatist model of the economy. The CNV still prefers cooperating with employers over strikes.

In recent years it has been more successful in adapting to new societal trends compared to the FNV. It has founded a youth union, CNV-jongeren to address the issues of the ageing population and it has campaigned on issues of international cooperation with a separate organisation called CNV international.

Organisation
The CNV is a federation of three affiliated trade unions. Its board is formed by four daily board members (a chairman, a vice-chairman, a secretary and a treasurer), and the chairs of the affiliated unions. The CNV has around 355,000 members. The current chair is Maurice Limmen. Although the CNV is formally independent of other organisations there are strong ideological and personal links with the CDA. Former CNV vice chair Aart-Jan de Geus served between 2002 and 2007 as CDA minister of Social Affairs and Employment for instance.

Affiliates

Current affiliates

Former affiliates

Presidents
1909: Hendrik Diemer
1916: Klaas Kruithof
1935: Antoon Stapelkamp
1947: Marinus Ruppert
1959: Cor van Mastrigt
1964: Jan van Eibergen
1969: Jan Lanser
1978: Harm van der Meulen
1986: Henk Hofstede
1992: Anton Westerlaken
1998: Doekle Terpstra
2005: Josine Westerbeek-Huitink
2005: René Paas
2009: Bert van Boggelen
2010: Jaap Smit
2014: Maurice Limmen
2018: Arend van Wijngaarden
2020: Piet Fortuin

References

External links
 Archief CNV at the International Institute of Social History

International Trade Union Confederation
European Trade Union Confederation
1909 establishments in the Netherlands
National trade union centers of the Netherlands
Trade unions established in 1909